Dangerous Curves is a 1939 thriller novel by the British writer Peter Cheyney. It was the second novel featuring his private detective character Slim Callaghan, following The Urgent Hangman  (1938). Callaghan is hired by Mrs. Riverton to find her missing stepson, who she openly admits she despises.

Stage adaptation
In 1953 it was adapted into play of the same title by Gerald Verner. Starring Terence De Marney as Callaghan it ran for 53 performances at the Garrick Theatre in London's West End with a cast that also included Stephen Dartnell, Shaw Taylor and Paul Whitsun-Jones. De Marney had also starred in Meet Mr. Callaghan, a 1952 stage version of The Urgent Hangman.

References

Bibliography
Reilly, John M. Twentieth Century Crime & Mystery Writers. Springer, 2015. p. 300. . .

1939 British novels
Novels by Peter Cheyney
British thriller novels
British novels adapted into plays
William Collins, Sons books